36 Saints is a 2013 American thriller film directed by Eddy Duran and starring Franky G, Jeffrey De Serrano  (who also co-wrote the screenplay), Donna McKechnie, Jaime Tirelli and Britne Oldford.

Cast
Franky G as Joseph Reyes
Jeffrey De Serrano as Michael Montoya
Britne Oldford as Eve
Donna McKechnie as Miss L
Tyrone Brown as Valentine
Matthew Daddario as Sebastian
Aja Naomi King as Joan
Chris Riggi as Dominic
Alesandra Assante as Maria
Jaime Tirelli as Father Judas Neri
Laverne Cox as Genesuis

References

External links
 
 

American thriller films
2013 thriller films
2013 films
2010s English-language films
2010s American films